Nirvana is an album by jazz flautist Herbie Mann with Bill Evans's Trio featuring Chuck Israels and Paul Motian, released in 1964 on the Atlantic label and featuring performances recorded in 1961 and 1962.

Reception
The Allmusic review by Ken Dryden states "Mann, who has changed his style numerous times throughout his long career, is heard exclusively in a straight-ahead and bop context on this pair of studio dates. Evans, who studied flute through his college years, rarely recorded with a flutist... though he was fond of the instrument... fans of either Herbie Mann or Bill Evans will want to acquire this enjoyable set."

Track listing
 "Nirvana" (Herbie Mann) - 5:48
 "Gymnopedie" (Erik Satie) - 3:16
 "I Love You" (Cole Porter) - 7:03
 "Willow Weep for Me" (Ann Ronell) - 5:31
 "Lover Man" (Jimmy Davis, Ram Ramirez, James Sherman) - 4:49
 "Cashmere" (Herbie Mann) - 6:45

Recorded on December 8, 1961 (tracks 1 & 3-5) and May 4, 1962 (tracks 2 & 6).

Personnel
Bill Evans - piano
Herbie Mann - flute
Chuck Israels - bass
Paul Motian - drums

References

1964 albums
Atlantic Records albums
Bill Evans albums
Herbie Mann albums
Albums produced by Nesuhi Ertegun
Collaborative albums